The first cabinet of Ion Emanuel Florescu was the government of Romania from 4 April to 26 April 1876.

Ministers
Cabinet ministers were:

President of the Council of Ministers:
Gen. Ion Emanuel Florescu (4 April - 26 April 1876)
Minister of the Interior: 
Gen. Ion Emanuel Florescu (4 April - 26 April 1876)
Minister of Foreign Affairs: 
Dimitrie Cornea (4 April - 26 April 1876)
Minister of Finance:
Gen. Christian Tell (4 April - 26 April 1876)
Minister of Justice:
Dimitrie P. Vioreanu (4 - 24 April 1876)
(interim) Dimitrie Cornea (24 - 26 April 1876)
Minister of War:
Gen. Ion Emanuel Florescu (4 April - 26 April 1876)
Minister of Religious Affairs and Public Instruction:
Alexandru Orăscu (4 April - 26 April 1876)
Minister of Public Works:
Gen. Tobias Gherghely (4 April - 26 April 1876)

References

Cabinets of Romania
Cabinets established in 1876
Cabinets disestablished in 1876
1876 establishments in Romania
1876 disestablishments in Romania